Russians in Turkmenistan are a minority ethnic group, numbering 297,913 as of 2000 census representing 4% of the population. Most ethnic Russians migrated to Turkmenistan during the 20th century. Many settlements were founded in the north of the country. The Russian population reached its peak just before the breakup of the Soviet Union. Most ethnic Russians live in the capital city of Turkmenistan, Ashgabat. Significant populations are found in other major cities. The main religion of Russians in Turkmenistan is Russian Orthodoxy.

Discrimination 

The Turkmen government's decision to cancel a dual-citizenship agreement with Russia in 2003 prompted thousands of ethnic Russians to leave Turkmenistan as they lost their property. Many of those fleeing "in panic" reportedly feared being trapped in a state which has been widely criticised for human rights abuses and has imposed severe restrictions on foreign travel for its citizens. Those without Russian passports may be forced to become Turkmens, and fear that they may never be able to return to Russia.

For these who remained, estimated at around 100,000, all Soviet-time diplomas, certificates and other official documents that were issued outside the Turkmen SSR were nullified, drastically limiting the people's access to work. At the same time, universities have been encouraged to reject applicants with non-Turkmen surnames, especially ethnic Russians. Russian television is difficult to receive in Turkmenistan, the Russian-language radio station Mayak was taken off the air and the Russian newspapers were banned earlier.

Notable people 

 Begench Beknazarov, half-Turkmen/Russian Jewish military officer.
 Oleg Kononenko, Turkmen-Russian cosmonaut
 Igor Makarov, Russian businessman
 Muza Niyazova, 1st First Lady of Turkmenistan, wife of Saparmurat Niyazov
 , former Deputy Chairman of the Supreme Soviet of Turkmenia and Minister of Finance from 1995 to 1996.
 Mikhail Nyukhtikov, Soviet Army Colonel, Hero of Turkmenistan and the Soviet Union.

See also  
 Demographics of Turkmenistan
 Russia–Turkmenistan relations

References 

Russian diaspora in Asia